Monica Porter (born Mónika Halász) is a London-based journalist who, in both articles and books, has often written about her Hungarian émigré family background. She has to some extent specialised in first-person writing, covering a wide range of human relationship issues about which she is characteristically honest and outspoken.Monica Porter -

Biography
Porter was born in Budapest, Hungary. Her father was the writer and journalist Péter Halász and her mother was singer Vali Racz. Her family fled from Hungary, along with some 200,000 others, in November 1956, when the Hungarian Revolution was suppressed by the Soviet Union. The Halasz family escaped via Austria and immigrated to the United States.

Monica Porter grew up first in the Bronx, New York City, and later in the suburb of Hartsdale, where she attended Woodlands High School. In 1970 she moved to London, England, in order to study acting at the Webber Douglas Academy of Dramatic Art. She only stayed for one year, however, and on leaving began to write. Her first published articles appeared in the weekly newspaper, The Stage. From 1974 to 1978 she worked as a staff writer on the Local Government Chronicle.

In the early 1970s she also broadcast regularly for the Hungarian section of Radio Free Europe. Much later, in the early 1990s, she made a series of Personal View broadcasts for the English-language BBC World Service.

Monica Porter's first book was The Paper Bridge: A Return to Budapest. Part memoir, part travelogue and part personal portrait of Hungary at the beginning of the 1980s, it was published in 1981, and re-printed in an expanded edition in 2009. Her second book was Deadly Carousel: A Singer's Story of the Second World War (published in 1990 and re-issued in 2006), which centred on the wartime exploits of her mother, who saved the lives of several Jewish friends during the Nazi occupation of Hungary in 1944. Vali Racz was honoured as a Righteous Gentile by Yad Vashem, in Jerusalem, in 1991, as a result of her story coming to light with the publication of Porter's book.

Throughout most of the 1990s Porter worked full-time as a feature writer for the Daily Mail. For the past decade she has been a freelance journalist, contributing to a large number of British newspapers, including The Times, Sunday Times, Financial Times, The Guardian, Daily Telegraph, Daily Express, Evening Standard, Jewish Chronicle and Press Gazette, as well as magazines such as Good Housekeeping, Eve, Saga Magazine and Reader's Digest. Her weekly Daily Mail column, Missing and Found, has been running since 1999.

External links
 Monica Porter's website
  Monica Porter's articles on The Article
 Monica Porter's new book "Children Against Hitler"
 Monica Porter's book "Raven - My year of dating dangerously"
 Monica Porter and The Paper Bridge - Naim Attallah Online
 The Paper Bridge: A Return to Budapest By Monica Porter - Hungarian Cultural Centre, London
 Long Lost description on Quartetbooks.co.uk
 Long Lost review - Friends reunited (by Kirstie McCrum, Western Mail)
 "Opinion: The author in the e-age" at http://bookbrunch.co.uk
 The run-around on the ring-round | by Monica Porter
 Monica Porter tells Vali Rácz's story | Holocaust Memorial Day Trust

References

1952 births
Living people
British journalists
Writers from Budapest
Hungarian emigrants to England
People from the Bronx
People from Hartsdale, New York
Hungarian emigrants to the United States
American emigrants to England
People with acquired American citizenship
Naturalised citizens of the United Kingdom